Arthur Clarence Pratt (February 6, 1871 – August 26, 1948) was an office manager and political figure in Ontario. He represented Norfolk South in the Legislative Assembly of Ontario from 1905 to 1919 as a Conservative member.

He was born in Lynedoch, Norfolk County, the son of William Pratt and Maria Bottomley, both natives of Ireland, and was educated in Simcoe and Woodstock, at the Ottawa Normal School and at the Hamilton Normal College. In 1900, Pratt married Alice Bertha Turner. In 1911, with George Tate Blackstock, he founded the Canadian branch of the English Imperial Mission association. He was named lieutenant-colonel of the 133rd Battalion in the Canadian Expeditionary Force in 1916. He died suddenly in 1948.

References

External links

1871 births
1948 deaths
Canadian Methodists
Progressive Conservative Party of Ontario MPPs